Barbara Lee Poletti is a former Australia lawn bowls international.

Bowsl career
Poletti won a silver medal in the Women's fours at the Commonwealth Games in Kuala Lumpur with Karen Murphy, Margaret Sumner and Marilyn Peddell.

She also won two gold medals at the Asia Pacific Bowls Championships in the triples and fours. She was inducted into the Western Australia Hall of Fame in 2016.

She played for the state until 2013 and won ten state titles (6 fours, 2 pairs and 1 in singles and triples).

References

Living people
1948 births
Bowls players at the 1998 Commonwealth Games
Bowls players at the 2002 Commonwealth Games
Commonwealth Games silver medallists for Australia
Australian female bowls players
Commonwealth Games medallists in lawn bowls
20th-century Australian women
21st-century Australian women
Medallists at the 1998 Commonwealth Games